Voyles is an English surname, of Welsh origin.  It is a variant of Voyle.  Notable people with the surname include:

Brad Voyles (born 1976), American baseball player
Carl M. Voyles (1898–1982), American football coach
Phil Voyles (1900–1972), American baseball player
Scott Voyles (born 1980), American conductor
William Voyles (1741–1798), American Revolutionary War soldier

English-language surnames